Flapper locking is a type of locking mechanism used in self-loading firearms. It involves a pair of flappers on the sides of the bolt that each lock into an outwards recess in the receiver as the bolt is in battery. As the bolt is forced backwards after the firing of a cartridge, the flappers recede back into the bolt, therefore unlocking and sending the bolt backwards to cycle the gun. The design was patented in 1870 by Lieutenant Friberg of the Swedish Army, but the first actual example of a firearm that used this was made by another Swedish man named Kjellman in 1907. Most use of flapper locking came from the designs of the Soviet Union's Vasily Degtyaryov in the years surrounding World War II.

Examples 
Gewehr 41 (Walther)
Gewehr 43 
Degtyaryov machine gun
RPD machine gun
DShK
EM-2 rifle
AVS-36; used as secondary locking
MG 51
Mauser 1906/08 pistol and 1905/06 rifle

See also 
Roller locked (similar)
Rotating bolt
Bolt action

References

Firearm actions